The Table is the seventh Korean extended play by the South Korean boy band NU'EST, released on October 21, 2019.

Background and release

On September 30, 2019, Pledis Entertainment confirmed NU'EST's comeback was set for October 21, 2019, and uploaded a teaser ending with the text, "The book has been closed. And shall we meet at...?", officially concluding their "Three-part Knight Series" spanning from Q is to Happily Ever After. After releasing several trailers for each member, a final trailer was uploaded on October 12, 2019.

In contrast to NU'EST's previous albums, The Table featured a "lovely and bright" concept, opting for a more easygoing and familiar concept for listeners. The Table revolves around the theme of love, with each song representing stories that friends and families would share about romances while sitting at a dinner table. The album took more retakes to record than ever due to the members of NU'EST finding difficulties in adjusting concepts. The album is sold in three different versions with alternate photo books and covers: the Forenoon Ver., On The Table Ver., and Pieces of Pie Ver.

Composition

The album was produced by Baekho and Bumzu. The title track, "Love Me", expresses a "sweet love" while using elements of alternative house and urban R&B. The song describes a person in love, strengthened from the sad feelings of protecting his love from the "Three-part Knight Series." It was also described with having an "addictive" chorus. To accentuate the soft image, the choreography of the song focused on romantic and delicate gestures.

The opening track, "Call Me Back", is an R&B song opening with an easygoing acoustic guitar. "One Two Three" is a new jack swing song expressing the happy emotions and heartbeat of a person falling in love. "Trust Me" is a pop R&B song expressing the feeling of running towards a loved one. The lyrics of "Stay Up All Night" express memories of a past love. "If We" is a mixture of folk rock and ballad. JR, who mainly provides rap, notably provided vocals to the song instead.

Reception

In South Korea, The Table debuted at #2 on the Gaon Music Chart, selling a cumulative total of 219,477 copies.

Track listing

Charts

Accolades

Music programs awards

References

NU'EST albums
K-pop EPs
2019 EPs
Korean-language EPs
Hybe Corporation EPs